Party X was a political party in Poland.

History
Party X was established in 1990 by Stanisław Tymiński after the first round of the presidential elections that year. Despite attracting significant publicity in its early days, the party's reputation was damaged by numerous splits and several party activists being revealed to be former secret security agents.

In the 1991 parliamentary elections it received 0.5% of the vote, winning three seats in the Sejm. Although its vote share in the Senate election was much higher at 3.6%, it failed to win a seat in the upper house.

Despite increasing its vote share in the 1993 Sejm election to 2.7%, it failed to win a seat, following the introduction of a 5% electoral threshold. The party failed to collect enough signatures for Tymiński to run in the 1995 presidential elections.

The party did not contest the 1997 parliamentary elections, and was briefly deregistered in the same year. In 1999 it was disbanded.

References

Defunct political parties in Poland
Political parties established in 1990
Political parties disestablished in 1999